Rivercourt Methodist Church is a church in King Street, Hammersmith, London.

It was built in 1875 by the architect Charles Bell.

References

External links
 Official website

Hammersmith
Churches completed in 1875
19th-century Methodist church buildings
Churches in the London Borough of Hammersmith and Fulham
Hammersmith
19th-century churches in the United Kingdom